The splenial is a  small bone in the lower jaw of reptiles, amphibians and birds, usually located on the lingual side (closest to the tongue) between the angular and surangular.

References

Vertebrate anatomy